The CAGA House was a 30-storey skyscraper in Sydney, NSW, Australia. When it was completed in 1977, it was the 10th tallest building in Sydney. The building stood for 15 years before being dismantled to make way for the Governor Phillip Tower. It was the tallest building in Sydney to be demolished until the nearby State Office Block was pulled down to make way for the Aurora Place.

The building was built on the site of the Hotel Metropole.

See also
 List of tallest voluntarily demolished buildings

References 

Former buildings and structures in Sydney
Demolished buildings and structures in Sydney
Office buildings completed in 1977
Buildings and structures demolished in 1992
Former skyscrapers